FirePro may refer to:

 FirePro Systems, a fire engineering company based in Europe; see Automatic fire suppression
 Firepro Systems (India)
 AMD FirePro, a graphics card from US-based Advanced Micro Devices
 Firepro Systems Private Limited (India), a security and building management systems provider
 Fire Pro Wrestling, a wrestling video game series from Japan